Rinda may refer to

Rinda (Norse mythology), a person in Norse mythology, sometimes called Rindr
Rinda (Okage), a character from the console role-playing game Okage: Shadow King
Rinda (Ruby programming language), a software library for Ruby programming language 
Rinda, Latvia, a village in Ance Parish, Latvia
, river in Latvia

See also